Xuxa e Seus Amigos is the first studio album by Brazilian singer, TV host, and actress Xuxa Meneghel, and the first solo and containing her stage name, released in November 1985 by Philips in Brazil.

On this album the host sings along with several guests to (Caetano Veloso, Zizi Possi, Marina, Nara Leão, Chico Buarque, Erasmo Carlos, Biquini Cavadão) being honored in some tracks like the track 7, "Xa-Xe-Xi-Xo- Xuxa" sung by the Os Trapalhões that even before the race on TV Globo, showed great charisma for it. The album was produced by Roberto Menescal.

In 1990 was re-released in Argentina by Polygram (now Universal Music), with the title in Spanish: Xuxa Y Sus Amigos.

Track listing

Personnel
Production Director: Roberto Menescal
Recording Technician: Ary Carvalhaes, Jairo Gualberto, Marcio
Auxiliary: Barroso, Manoel, Charles, Marquinhos
Recorded in studios: Polygram - Rio de Janeiro
Court: Américo
Cover and Graphic Coordination: Jorge Vianna
Photos: André Wanderlei
Mixing: Jairo Gualberto e Marcio

References

External links 
 Xuxa e Seus Amigos at Discogs

1985 debut albums
Xuxa albums
Children's music albums
Portuguese-language albums